Domenico Cavalca (Vicopisano, c. 1270 – Pisa, October 1342) was an Italian writer.

He was a friar of the Dominican order and lived a life, mostly spent in the monastery of Santa Caterina, of irreproachable morals, characterized by attention to the poor and the sick. Cavalca dedicated much time and care to nunneries in the province of Pisa and his activity led to the foundation in 1342, just before his death, of the Dominican nunnery of Santa Marta (today no longer existing) in Pisa.

The works of Cavalca, of religious or ascetic subject, are in part original, in part derived from Latin texts. His treatises are strongly influenced by Summae virtutum ac vitiorum, a treatise written in the thirteenth century by the French Dominican William Perault.

Cavalca became a very famous writer and in the following centuries many works were attributed to him, but in many cases these were erroneous attributions.

Works
Vite dei santi Padri. Translation into the vernacular of the Vitae Patrum
Dialogo di San Gregorio. Translation into the vernacular of the Dialogues of Pope Gregory I
Atti degli Apostoli. Translation into the vernacular of the Acts of the Apostles
Epistola di San Girolamo a Eustochio. Translation into the vernacular of a letter of Saint Jerome to Eustochium
Specchio di Croce. A treatise inspired by the image of Christ on the cross, with many reflections on the passages of the four Four Gospels about the Passion
Medicina del cuore ovvero trattato della Pazienza. A collection of two treatises dedicated to wrath and patience
Specchio dei peccati (The mirror of sins), 1333. A treatise with reflections on confession and penitence
Pungilingua. A treatrise on the dangers of the misuse of the language
Frutti della lingua. A treatise on preaching
Disciplina degli spirituali. A treatise about common wrong attitudes of people devoted to spiritual life
Trattato delle trenta stoltizie. A treatise about the errors made in the fight against the temptations of the evil
Esposizione del Simbolo degli Apostoli.

Sources

13th-century births
1342 deaths
Italian male writers
14th-century Italian writers
People from the Province of Pisa